The pale shrew tenrec (Microgale fotsifotsy), also known as the pale-footed shrew tenrec is a species of mammal in the family Tenrecidae. It is endemic to Madagascar. Its natural habitats are subtropical and tropical moist lowland and montane forests.

References

Afrosoricida
Mammals of Madagascar
Taxonomy articles created by Polbot
Mammals described in 1997